Agathe Cléry is a 2008 French comedy film directed and co-written by Etienne Chatiliez, with co-writer Laurent Chouchan.

Plot 
Agathe Cléry is a marketing manager for a line of cosmetics for people with pale skin. She is also racist, particularly towards black people. However, she is diagnosed with Addison's disease, which turns her skin dark. The film follows her struggles as a black person dealing with discrimination against her due to her skin colour.

Cast
 Valérie Lemercier - Agathe Cléry
 Anthony Kavanagh - Quentin Lambert
 Dominique Lavanant - Mimie
 Isabelle Nanty - Joëlle
 Jacques Boudet - Roland
 Artus de Penguern - Hervé
 Jean Rochefort - Louis Guignard
 Bernard Alane - Philippe Guignard
 Nadège Beausson-Diagne - Nathalie
 François Duval - Loïc Guignard
 Valentine Valera - Nathalie
 Élise Otzenberger - Lucie
 Claire Pataut - Alice
 Virginie Raccosta - Delphine
 Andy Cocq - Cédric
 Julie Ferrier - The Cop

References

External links 
 

2008 films
French musical comedy films
2000s French-language films
French black comedy films
2000s musical comedy films
2008 black comedy films
Films scored by Bruno Coulais
Films directed by Étienne Chatiliez
2000s French films